State Route 85 (abbreviated SR 85) is part of Maine's system of numbered state highways, located in the southern central part of the state.

Route description
SR 85 begins at US 302/SR 35 in southern Raymond.  The highway heads north through town and passes along the west side of Crescent Lake.  SR 85 crosses into Casco and immediately terminates at SR 11. Locally, it is known as Webbs Mills Road, for its terminus is located in Webbs Mills, a small village in Casco. The road almost directly parallels SR 121, and provides an alternate route to get to the Lake Region, and thus avoiding the traffic on US 302.

Junction list

References

External links

Floodgap Roadgap's RoadsAroundME: Maine State Route 85

085
Transportation in Cumberland County, Maine